Samuel Watson CBE (11 March 1898 – 7 May 1967) was Agent of the Durham Miners' Association and member of the British Labour Party’s National Executive Committee.

Watson was born on 11 March 1898 in the village of Boldon Colliery, in County Durham. After an elementary education, at the age of 14 he became an underground coalminer at Boldon Colliery. By the age of 20 he had become secretary of the Boldon Miner's Lodge, continuing to work down the pit until 1936, when he became an agent of the Durham Miners' Association. In 1947 he became General Secretary of the recently reorganised National Union of Mineworkers (Durham Area).

He was active in the Labour Party, was for 22 years a member of its National Executive Committee, and served as its chairman for the year 1949–1950. He declined the possibility of seeking political office in London, however, preferring to remain in Durham.

He was a member of committees of the National Coal Board and undertook many other charitable and educational activities. He was made a CBE in 1946. He died at his home in Durham on 7 May 1967 aged 69.

References

External links
 biography at Durham Mining Museum
 biography at the Durham Miner project

1898 births
1967 deaths
English miners
British trade union leaders
People from The Boldons
Trade unionists from Tyne and Wear
Commanders of the Order of the British Empire
English trade unionists
Labour Party (UK) politicians
Chairs of the Labour Party (UK)